The 1965 All-Ireland Senior Hurling Championship Final was the 78th All-Ireland Final and the culmination of the 1965 All-Ireland Senior Hurling Championship, an inter-county hurling tournament for the top teams in Ireland. The match was held at Croke Park, Dublin, on 5 September 1965, between Wexford and Tipperary. The Leinster champions lost to their Munster opponents on a score line of 2–16 to 0-10.

Match details

All-Ireland Senior Hurling Championship Final
All-Ireland Senior Hurling Championship Final, 1965
All-Ireland Senior Hurling Championship Final
All-Ireland Senior Hurling Championship Finals
Tipperary GAA matches
Wexford GAA matches